Goleh Jar or Golah Jar or Galah Jar or Golah Jar or Geleh Jar may refer to:
 Goleh Jar, Ilam
 Golah Jar, Kermanshah